SS Canadian was a British passenger ship which struck an iceberg and sank in the Strait of Belle Isle  north of Cape Bauld while she was travelling from Quebec, Canada to Liverpool, United Kingdom.

Construction 
SS Canadian was launched on 10 December 1859 and completed in March 1860 at the Robert Steele & Co. shipyard in Greenock, United Kingdom for the Allan Line.

She had one 2 cyl. Compound engine driving a single screw propeller.

Sinking 
On 4 June 1861, SS Canadian sailed from Quebec, Canada to Liverpool, United Kingdom with 60 crew and 241 passengers on board.

When the Canadian sailed through the Strait of Belle Isle, ice and thick weather started to form and the captain ordered to slow the ship down to 5 knots while passing through the ice. At 11:50 AM the Canadian struck an iceberg which was largely hidden underwater. The collision fatally damaged the ship and the ship's 3 compartments were flooded quickly. Since the collision was at such a low speed and most passengers were preparing for lunch, nobody really noticed anything was wrong until passengers noticed that the crew in order of the captain were preparing the lifeboats to be lowered. Since the ship was sinking quickly, the crew needed to work very fast in order to evacuate everyone. All the lifeboats were safely launched, except lifeboat number 8 which capsized when being lowered, killing at least 30 people. The ship sank beneath the freezing ice-filled waters a half-hour after striking the iceberg. Some passengers and crew did not board a lifeboat and went down with the ship, in total 35 people perished in the disaster. Amongst those who perished was mail officer James Panton, who is considered to be one of the heroes during the sinking. He managed to guide many people to the lifeboats and even saved some of his mailbags. He also gave up his seat in a lifeboat for a female passenger. Mr. Panton was last seen hanging by a rope over the side of the ship as it went down. The 266 survivors were soon picked up by four French fishing vessels and taken to Quirpon Bay.

Wreck 

References

Steamships of the United Kingdom
Passenger ships of the United Kingdom
1859 ships
Ships built on the River Clyde
Ships sunk in collisions
Maritime incidents in June 1861
Shipwrecks of the Newfoundland and Labrador coast
Ships sunk by icebergs
Ships built in the United Kingdom